Cecily Edith Mary Cousens (1918–2008) was a female diver who competed for England.

Cousens won a bronze medal in the 10 Metres Platform at the 1934 British Empire Games in London, and was National Diving Champion in 1935.

References

1918 births
2008 deaths
English female divers
Divers at the 1934 British Empire Games
Commonwealth Games medallists in diving
Commonwealth Games bronze medallists for England
People from Swindon
Medallists at the 1934 British Empire Games